Jangji-dong is a neighbourhood, dong of Songpa-gu, Seoul, South Korea. The old name of the dong was janbeodeuri (잔버드리), derived from jan beodeul (잔버들, willow) where the species grew a lot.

Education
Schools located in Jangji-dong:
 Seoul Munhyeon Elementary School
 Seoul Songrye Elementary School
 Munhyeon Middle School
 Songrye Middle School
 Munhyeon High School
 Hanlim Multi Art School

Transportation 
 Jangji station of 

See also
Administrative divisions of South Korea

References

External links
  Jangji-dong resident center website
 Songpa-gu map

Neighbourhoods of Songpa District